The River Coln is a river in Gloucestershire, England.  It rises to the north of Brockhampton, a village to the east of Cheltenham, and flows in a south/south-easterly direction through the Cotswold Hills via Andoversford, Withington, Fossebridge, Bibury, Coln St Aldwyns, Quenington and Fairford. It joins the River Thames to the south-west of Lechlade, near to the confluence with the Thames and Severn Canal.

Midway between Withington and Fossbridge the river passes Chedworth Roman Villa.

Extensive gravel pits between Fairford and Lechlade, now redundant, have been flooded to form the eastern component of the Cotswold Water Park. They are fed and drained by the Coln.

The river is host to many species of freshwater fish including brown trout and grayling.

Water quality
The Environment Agency measures the water quality of the river systems in England. Each is given an overall ecological status, which may be one of five levels: high, good, moderate, poor and bad. There are several components that are used to determine this, including biological status, which looks at the quantity and varieties of invertebrates, angiosperms and fish. Chemical status, which compares the concentrations of various chemicals against known safe concentrations, is rated good or fail.

Water quality of the River Coln in 2019:

See also
Tributaries of the River Thames
List of rivers in England

References

Coln
1Coln